The House of Howard is an English noble house founded by John Howard, who was created Duke of Norfolk (third creation) by King Richard III of England in 1483. However, John was also the eldest grandson (although maternal) of the 1st Duke of the first creation. The Howards have been part of the peerage since the 15th century and remain both the Premier Dukes and Earls of the Realm in the Peerage of England, acting as Earl Marshal of England. After the English Reformation, many Howards remained steadfast in their Catholic faith as the most high-profile recusant family; two members, Philip Howard, 13th Earl of Arundel, and William Howard, 1st Viscount Stafford, are regarded as martyrs: a saint and a blessed respectively.

The senior line of the house, as well as holding the title of Duke of Norfolk, is also Earl of Arundel, Earl of Surrey and Earl of Norfolk, as well as holding six baronies. The Arundel title was inherited in 1580, when the Howards became the genealogical successors to the paternally extinct FitzAlans, ancient kin to the House of Stuart, dating back to when the family first arrived in Great Britain from Brittany (see Alan fitz Flaad).

Thomas Howard, 4th Duke of Norfolk, married as his first wife Mary FitzAlan, who, after the death of her brother Henry in 1556, became heiress to the Arundel estates of her father Henry FitzAlan, 12th Earl of Arundel. Her son was the above-mentioned Philip Howard, 13th Earl of Arundel. It is from this marriage that the present Duke of Norfolk takes his surname of FitzAlan-Howard and why his seat is Arundel Castle. There have also been several notable cadet branches; those existing to this day include the Howards of Effingham, Howards of Carlisle, Howards of Suffolk and Howards of Penrith. The former three are earldoms, and the latter a barony.

Throughout much of English and later British history, the Howards have played an important role. Claiming descent from Hereward the Wake, the resister of the Norman conquest who has been much celebrated in folklore, John Howard fought to the death at the Battle of Bosworth Field in defence of the cause for the House of York. They regained favour with the new Tudor dynasty after leading a defence of England from Scottish invasion at the Battle of Flodden, and Catherine Howard subsequently became the fifth wife and Queen consort to King Henry VIII. Her uncle, Thomas Howard, 3rd Duke of Norfolk, played a significant role in Henrician politics. Charles Howard, 1st Earl of Nottingham, served as Lord Admiral of the English fleet which defeated the invading Spanish Armada.

Arundel Castle has been in the family of the Duke of Norfolk for over 400 years, and it is still the principal seat of the Norfolk family. As cultural heritage, it is a Grade I listed building.

Origins

The later Howards would claim a fanciful descent from Hereward the Wake who was of Mercian background and resisted the Norman conquest of England from his base at the Isle of Ely. Hereward subsequently became a mainstay of English folklore.

A pedigree compiled and signed by Sir William Dugdale, Norroy King of Arms of the College of Arms, and dated 8 April 1665, stated that the Howard family are descended from the Howarth [sic, Howard] family of Great Howarth Hall, Rochdale. Also, "it is clear from above seventy deeds, without date, that the Howards, Dukes of Norfolk, do derive from the Howards Howarth of Great Howarth and that William Howard of Wigenhall… was a direct decedent of Osbert Howard de Howarth," and given lands in Rochdale on behalf of his service as Master of King Henry I's Buckhounds. Dugdale's account, however, has been disputed.

The indisputable descent begins with Sir William Howard (d.1308) of East Winch and Wiggenhall in Norfolk, a Justice of the Court of Common Pleas, who was summoned as a justice to the House of Commons in the Model Parliament of 1295. Sir William's son, Sir John Howard I, became Sheriff of Norfolk and Suffolk and married Joan de Cornwall, an illegitimate grand-daughter of Richard, 1st Earl of Cornwall and King of the Romans, the second son of King John.

History

Sir William's great-great-great-grandson, Sir Robert Howard, married Lady Margaret Mowbray, elder daughter of Thomas Mowbray, 1st Duke of Norfolk (1366–1399). The Mowbray line of Dukes died out in 1476 and the heiress of the last Duke, Anne Mowbray, died at the age of nine in 1481; after declaring her widower King Edward IV's son Richard of Shrewsbury, 1st Duke of York, illegitimate, Richard III of England created the son of Sir Robert and Lady Margaret, John Howard, 1st Duke of Norfolk, of a new creation on 28 June 1483, the 200th anniversary of the Barony of Mowbray to which he was also senior co-heir. John had previously been summoned to Parliament as Lord Howard by Edward IV. He was also created hereditary Earl Marshal. John's son and heir, Thomas Howard, 2nd Duke of Norfolk, was the grandfather of two English queens, Anne Boleyn and Catherine Howard, both wives of Henry VIII.

The Howard family became one of the foremost recusant families due to their continued adherence to Roman Catholicism throughout the English Reformation and its aftermath. This meant that they often could not take their seats in the House of Lords. They are still known as the most prominent English Catholic family.

Both the Dukedom and Earl Marshalship have been the subject of repeated attainders and restorations in the 15th to 17th centuries. Before Charles II restored the titles for good, the Howards had inherited the ancient title of Earl of Arundel through an heiress, and formed additional branches that have continued to this day.

A branch of the Howard family has been seated at Castle Howard, one of England's most magnificent country houses, for over 300 years.

In order of genealogical seniority:

the Barons Howard of Penrith descend from a younger brother of the 12th Duke;
the Earls of Suffolk and Berkshire descend from the 2nd son of the 4th Duke;
the Earls of Carlisle descend from the third son of the 4th Duke;
the Earls of Effingham descend from the fourth son of the 2nd Duke, who was Lord High Admiral and whose son was commander in chief against the Spanish Armada. (Curiously, this line was excluded from eligibility to inherit on the restoration of the Dukedom).

Howard family tree

Arms of the Howard family
See:  Gallery of Howard Arms

The Howard family's original arms were the white bend on red with the crosslets.  On marrying the heiress of the dukes of Norfolk, the first Howard duke of Norfolk quartered his arms with those of Thomas of Brotherton 1st Earl of Norfolk, son of King Edward I Longshanks as well as the Mowbray arms.  Starting with the 2nd Duke of Norfolk, the Howards added in the 3rd quarter the checkered blue and gold of the Warren Earls of Surrey, whom they became heirs of.  Philip Howard was deprived of the dukedom of Norfolk, which was under attainer, but inherited the earldom of Arundel.  His descendants used the gold lion on red of the Fitzalan Earls of Arundel in the 4th quarter.

Earl Marshal is a hereditary royal officeholder and chivalric title under the sovereign of the United Kingdom used in England (then, following the Act of Union 1800, in the United Kingdom).  It is the eighth of the Great Officers of State in the United Kingdom, ranking beneath the Lord High Constable and above the Lord High Admiral.  The Earl Marshal has responsibility for the organisation of State funerals and the monarch's coronation in Westminster Abbey. He is also a leading officer of arms.  The office is hereditary in the Howard Family in their position as Dukes of Norfolk, the senior dukedom in the United Kingdom.

Titles

Bibliography
 William Dugdale, Baronage of England (London, 1675–76);
 Collins, Peerage of England (fifth edition, London, 1779);
 Henry Howard, Memorials of the Howard Family (privately printed, 1834);
 Edmund Lodge, Portraits of Illustrious Personages (London, 1835); The Howard Papers, with a Biographical Pedigree and Criticism by Canston (London, 1862);
 Yeatman, The Early Genealogical History of the House of Arundel (London, 1882);
 Doyle, Official Baronage of England (London, 1886);
 Brenan and Statham, The House of Howard (London, 1907).

References

External links

 European Heraldry page
 http://www.tudorplace.com.ar/HOWARD1.htm 

 
Noble families of the United Kingdom
History of Catholicism in England
Roman Catholic families
Political families of the United Kingdom
Catholicism in the United Kingdom
Glossop
Recusants